Labastide-du-Vert (Occitan: La Bastida del Vèrn) is a commune in the Lot department in the Occitania region in Southwestern France. In 2019, it had a population of 270.

Notable people
 Henri-Jean Guillaume Martin (1860–1943), painter, died in Labastide-du-Vert

See also
Communes of the Lot department

References

Labastideduvert